Kelsea Ballerini is the self-titled debut extended play (EP) by American country pop singer Kelsea Ballerini. It was released on November 24, 2014, by Black River Entertainment. The EP contains five tracks that would later be included on Ballerini's debut full-length album, The First Time, in 2015, including the singles "Love Me Like You Mean It", "Dibs", and "Yeah Boy".

Background
Ballerini first signed a publishing deal with Black River Entertainment in 2010, and later signed a recording contract with the company in December 2013. Her debut single, "Love Me Like You Mean It", was released digitally on July 8, 2014. When it impacted country radio in September 2014, it became the most added debut single by a female artist that year. Three weeks before the release of the EP, Ballerini was named one of the "Next Women of Country" by CMT for her breakthrough success with "Love Me Like You Mean It".

Commercial performance
Kelsea Ballerini debuted and peaked at number 12 on the Billboard Heatseekers Albums chart for the week of December 13, 2014. Following the success of "Love Me Like You Mean It", the EP garnered renewed interest and entered the Top Country Albums chart at its peak position of 40 for the week of March 28, 2015. As of March 2015, the EP has sold 7,400 copies in the US.

Track listing

Charts

References 

2014 debut EPs
Kelsea Ballerini albums
Black River Entertainment albums